It Dreams is the debut album by Jakalope, released on October 26, 2004.

The music videos made for the album are known for the clone and hybrid theme connected to the band. Videos featuring Dave Ogilvie as a Dr. Evar and Katie B presented a sort of story for fans to follow, bolstered by a site contest which allowed fans insight into the so-called 'Jakalope world', and hinted at the back story of Dr. Evar and Katie's characters. A large part of the plot was left to the interpretation of fans in the end, especially concerning the Katie B character.

As a CD, this album is only available as an import from Canada and Japan. However, the album is available as a download from iTunes in both the United States and Canada.

Samples of the music, along with videos, can be found at Jakalope's web site.

Track listing

Personnel
Adapted from Discogs.

Jim McGrath – additional arrangements
Vincent Marcone – art direction 
Rosemary Ogilvie – artwork
Trent Reznor – co-producer
Jamey Koch – co-producer, mixing
I Braineater – logo design
Aubrey Winfield – executive producer
Tom Baker – mastering
Phil Western – additional mixing
Daryn Barry, John Nazario – mixing assistants (Orange Lounge)
Mike Cashin, Pete MacLaggan – mixing assistants (Warehouse)
Dave Ogilvie – recording, production, mixing, songwriter
Anthony Valcic – recording, production, mixing
Bryan Gallant – assistant recording
Kirk McNally – assistant recording

References

2004 debut albums
Jakalope albums